Brian Farmer MacCabe (9 January 1914 – 31 October 1992) was an English athlete who competed for Great Britain in the 1936 Summer Olympics.

He was born in Willesden and died in Beaconsfield.

In 1936 he finished ninth in the 800 metres event.

At the 1938 Empire Games he was a member of the English relay team which won the silver medal in the 4×440 yards competition. In the 880 yards contest he finished sixth and in the 440 yards event he was eliminated in the heats.

MacCabe served in the Royal Tank Regiment during the Second World War and was awarded a Military Cross and bar for service in North Africa.

After the War he rose rapidly in the field of advertising, becoming the youngest ever recipient of the Mackintosh Medal for services to advertising.

References

External links
sports-reference.com

1914 births
1992 deaths
English male sprinters
English male middle-distance runners
Olympic athletes of Great Britain
Athletes (track and field) at the 1936 Summer Olympics
Athletes (track and field) at the 1938 British Empire Games
Commonwealth Games silver medallists for England
Commonwealth Games medallists in athletics
People from Willesden
British Army personnel of World War II
Royal Tank Regiment officers
Recipients of the Military Cross
Medallists at the 1938 British Empire Games